The following is a list of all IFT-licensed over-the-air television stations broadcasting in the Mexican state of Veracruz. There are 29 television stations in Veracruz.

List of television stations

|-

|-

|-

|-

|-

|-

|-

|-

|-

|-

|-

|-

|-

|-

|-

|-

|-

|-

|-

|-

|-

|-

|-

|-

|-

|-

|-

|-

References

Television stations in Veracruz
Veracruz